Early Mornin' Stoned Pimp is the third studio album by American rapper Kid Rock and the first to feature his backing band Twisted Brown Trucker. Released on January 9, 1996 by Top Dog Records, the album saw Kid Rock showcasing a more eclectic sound than his previous albums, encompassing funk, hip hop, soul and rock. It was considered the most rock-oriented album he had made at the time.

The album is considered to be a further shift in Kid Rock's sound toward rock music, as well as solidifying his rap rock sound and shaping the redneck image he would become known for. It "captured the laid back pimp desperado persona that Rock had finally perfected".

Background

The recording sessions saw Kid Rock work with R&B singer Thornetta Davis, who says that she asked him not to credit her on the album due to its risque lyrics on the song Paid, but this request was ignored. The album's title came from engineer Bob Ebeling, who told a sleepless, alcoholic, drug-using Kid Rock, "Dude, you are the early-morning, stoned pimp." The recording sessions marked the first time Kid Rock would work with Jimmie "Bones" Trombly, who soon joined his backup band, Twisted Brown Trucker.

"Jackson, Mississippi" was originally recorded for the album, but remained unreleased until Kid Rock's self-titled 2003 album.

Artistry
Early Mornin' Stoned Pimp features what MTV describes as "[an] eclectic collection of funk, rap, soul and rock." It was his most rock-oriented album at the time, and is seen as solidifying the rap rock style that Kid Rock would become known for as a major label recording artist, and also for shaping Kid Rock's redneck image.

The title track "captured the laid back pimp desperado persona that Rock had finally perfected", according to The Village Voice writer Chaz Kangas. The song's lyrics also diss Billy Ray Cyrus. "Where U At Rock?" references philosopher Ayn Rand.

In Chuck Eddy's Rock and Roll Always Forgets: A Quarter Century of Music Criticism, the music on Early Morning Stoned Pimp is categorized by musical elements such as "descending symphonic blaxploitation wah-wah", "hardboiled barbeque rib joint boogie drama, soul sister backup", "synth sirens", "Frampton vocoders", "shotgun blasts, [and] spy movie organ". Eddy believes the album exhibits influence from Blowfly, Rudy Ray Moore, Swamp Dogg, Parliament and the dozens.

The lyrics of "Black Chick, White Guy" deal with Kid Rock's ten-year off-and-on relationship with a classmate named Kelley South Russell, with whom he fathered a son and also raised her son from a previous relationship, but broke up with her after finding out that a third child he was raising was not his, after which he gained custody of his son, Robert James Ritchie Jr.; these events became the inspiration for this song, which discusses them directly, although Russell denies some of the allegations made against her in the lyrics.

Release
According to Kid Rock, who distributed the album himself, Early Morning Stoned Pimp sold 14,000 copies. The album was not offered for sale when Kid Rock's catalog became available on iTunes.

Critical reception 

AllMusic, which did not review the album, gave it two and a half out of five stars. The Village Voice writer Chaz Kangas called the title track a "classic", writing, "The reason the track works so well is because Rock’s own love and incorporation of his musical references isn’t rooted in a nostalgia or a 'tribute,' but rather in his actively engaging the elements he finds compelling into a wholly new hodgepodge of his own invention."

Track listing
 "Intro" – 0:50
 "Early Mornin' Stoned Pimp" (featuring Tino) – 7:18
 "Paid" – 5:15
 "I Wanna Go Back" – 5:14
 "Live" (featuring Esham) – 2:34
 "Detroit Thang" (featuring The Howling Diablos) – 6:22
 "Ya Keep On" – 3:55
 "Shotgun Blast" – 2:18
 "Freestyle Rhyme" – 3:57
 "Classic Rock" – 2:42
 "My Name Is Rock" – 4:30
 "Where U at Rock" – 5:08
 "Krack Rocks" (featuring Uncle Kracker) – 4:09
 "The Prodigal Son Returns" – 3:16
 "Black Chick, White Guy" – 7:10
 "Outro" – 0:38

Personnel 
 Kid Rock – vocals
 Uncle Kracker – turntables
 Andrew Nerha – guitar, drums
 Chris Peters – guitar
 Bobby East – guitar, bass
 Bob Ebeling – drums
 Marlon Young – bass guitar
 Jimmie Bones – piano
 Eddie Harsch – organ
 Thornetta Davis – background vocals

References

1996 albums
Funk albums by American artists
Kid Rock albums
Midwest hip hop albums
Soul albums by American artists